The following is a timeline of the history of the city of Tulsa, Oklahoma, United States.

19th century

 1826 – Creek Indians began to settle town of Tulasi after their expulsion from the Southeastern United States.
 1861 – Battle of Chusto-Talasah – Civil War skirmish to north of Tulsa
 1878 – First post office established at Perryman ranch.
 1882 – 
 Atlantic & Pacific Railroad tracks laid from Vinita.
 T. J. (Jeff) Archer builds first mercantile store in downtown Tulsa
 1884 – Presbyterian church founded a mission day school that became the first public school after Tulsa was incorporated.
 1886 – First Methodist Episcopal Church organized in December in Tulsey Town, Creek Nation.
 1893 – Indian Republican began publication as first newspaper.
 1887 – Tulsa founded.
 1896 – Town incorporated.
 1898
 Edward E. Calkins becomes first mayor.
 Population reported as 1,100.
 1899
 First mass said at Holy Family Church.
 Robert H. Hall built the first telephone system in Tulsa, serving 80 subscribers.
 Presbyterian mission school closed permanently after 1898-99 session; building purchased by J. M. Hall and 3 other men and reopened as first public school, beginning Tulsa Public School system.
 1900
 Commercial Club of Tulsa formed.
 Population: 1,390.

20th century

1900s-1940s
 1901 – Oil discovered at Red Fork, near Tulsa, starting oil boom.
 1902 – Tulsa chartered as a city.
 1903 
 Telephone system sold to Indian Territory Telephone Company.
 Original 3-story Brady Hotel constructed.
 George W. Mowbray, Sr. becomes Mayor of Tulsa (1903-4)
 1904
 Tulsa annexed North Tulsa.
 First Tulsa bridge built across Arkansas River.
 Pumping plant built to deliver Arkansas River water to consumers via piping system.
 Indian Territory Telephone Company bought by Pioneer Company
 Accidental explosion destroyed Archer store, killed a customer and mortally wounded Jeff Archer.
 1905 

 Tulsa World newspaper begins publication.
 Oil discovered at Glenn Pool near Tulsa.
 First two public schools built.
 1906
 Tulsa Hospital opens (would close after WWI).
 Trolley begins operating.
 Tulsa High School built.
 Oklahoma Natural Gas Company, now named OneOK, founded.

 1907
 Tulsa becomes part of the new U.S. state of Oklahoma, and county seat of newly formed Tulsa County.
 Henry Kendall College moved from Muskogee to Tulsa.
 Population: 7,298.
 1908 
Commission form of government adopted.
Orcutt Lake and Amusement Park, privately owned and developed, opened, advertised as Tulsa's first playground.

 1909
West Tulsa becomes part of Tulsa.
 Tulsa buys land that would become Woodward Park.

 1910
 Tulsa County Court House built.
 Population: 18,182.
 Exchange National Bank founded after failure of Farmers' National Bank.
 Texaco builds first oil refinery in West Tulsa.
 Oil & Gas Journal, oil industry trade journal, headquartered in Tulsa.
 Area of city: 3.5 square miles.
 Hotel Brady annex and Tulsa Hotel were built.
 1913
 Booker T. Washington High School established.
 Joshua Cosden builds second oil refinery in West Tulsa.
 1914
 Tulsa Convention Hall built.
 Holy Family Cathedral dedicated.
 Temple Israel congregation founded.
 1915
 Oklahoma Hospital established.
 Chamber of Commerce active.
 1916 – Carnegie library opens, forerunner of the Tulsa Public Library system.
 1917 
Orcutt Lake Amusement Park closed and converted to Swan Lake residential area. Gus Orcutt sold his development to Tulsa developer, E. J. Brennan, who coined the name Swan Lake. Brennan donated the lake itself to the City of Tulsa as a public park.
Tulsa Central High School construction completed
Tulsa Outrage occurs.
 1918
 Morningside Hospital opened.
 Cosden Building constructed, considered first "skyscraper" in city.

 1920
 Henry Kendall College becomes University of Tulsa.
 Tulsa Tribune newspaper in publication.
 Population: 72,075.
 1921
 May 31 – June 1: Tulsa race massacre devastated Greenwood.
 All Souls Unitarian Church founded.
 1922
 Tulsa Little Theater founded.
 Atlas Life Building constructed.
 1923
 First International Petroleum Exposition.
 Major flood of Arkansas River heavily damages Tulsa water purification plant and causes its relocation to a site near Mohawk Park.
 1924
 Spavinaw Dam built.
 Tulsa Community Fund established.
 St. Johns Hospital opened.
 Southwestern Bell Telephone Company constructs Main Dial System Building.
 1925 – Mayo Hotel built.
 1926
 KVOO radio begins broadcasting.
 Tulsa State Fair grounds in use.
 1927
 Red Fork becomes part of Tulsa.
 Tulsa Civic Symphony active.
 Goodwill Industries of Tulsa incorporated.
 Tulsa Zoo opens.
 Tulsa Club Building constructed as a joint venture between the club and the Tulsa Chamber of Commerce.
 1928
Tulsa Coliseum constructed.
 Carbondale becomes part of Tulsa.
 Tulsa Municipal Airport dedicated.
 Spartan Aircraft Company in business.
 Spartan School of Aeronautics established.
 Philtower Building constructed.
 1929
 Tulsa Oilers ice hockey team played the Duluth Hornets for the grand opening of the Tulsa Coliseum on January 1. 
 Boston Avenue Methodist Church and National Bank of Tulsa Building constructed.
 Mohawk Park Waterworks Plant completed.
 Tulsa annexed Carbondale.
 Public Service Company Building completed.
 1930
 Cain's Dance Academy in business.
 Population: 141,258.
 1931
 Union Depot opens.
 Philcade Building constructed.
 First All Souls Unitarian Church completed.
 1932
 Tulsa Fairgrounds Pavilion (arena) built.
 Waite Phillips donated his home to become Philbrook Art Museum.
 1934 – National Conference of Christians and Jews Tulsa chapter founded.
 1935 - Brady Hotel destroyed by fire. (The gutted skeleton remained in place until 1970).
 1938
 KOME radio begins broadcasting.
 Webster High School opens.
 1939
 Morningside Hospital reorganized and renamed as Hillcrest Hospital.
 Philbrook Art Center opens.
 Will Rogers High School built.
 1940 – Population: 142,157.
 1941 – Air Force builds bomber plant at Tulsa Airport. Douglas Aircraft Co. builds bombers until WWII ends in 1945. Boeing reactivates plant to build B-47s from 1950 to 1953.
 1943 – Oklahoma Hospital becomes Oklahoma Osteopathic Hospital.
 1946 – American Airlines opens aircraft maintenance facility at Tulsa Airport.
 1948 – Tulsa Opera and Tulsa Philharmonic founded.
 1949
 Dawson becomes part of city.
 KOTV begins broadcasting.

1950s-1990s
 1950 – Population: 182,740.
 1951 – Bell's Amusement Park opens.
 1952 
 Lake Eucha and second pipeline from Lake Spavinaw to Tulsa constructed to supplement city water supply.
 Tulsa Coliseum destroyed by fire after being hit by lightning on September 27, 1952.
 1953
 Golden Driller statue created for and displayed at the International Petroleum Exposition.
 Tulsa Metropolitan Area Planning Commission established.
 1954 – KTUL-TV and KVOO-TV (television) begin broadcasting.
 1956
 Highland Park becomes part of Tulsa.
 Tulsa Ballet and Tulsa Baptist Association founded.
 1957
 All Souls Unitarian Church moves from downtown to Brookside
 1958
Apache Drive-In cinema opens.
Gilcrease Foundation conveyed Gilcrease Museum to the city.
1959
A black family's home in a predominantly white neighborhood in north Tulsa is bombed during the Civil rights movement.
 1960
 Saint Francis Hospital opens.
 Area of city: 50 square miles.
 Population: 261,685.
 1961 – New airport terminal opened.
 1963 – Tulsa Youth Symphony founded.
 1964 – Tulsa Convention Center opens.
 1965
 Oral Roberts University established.
 Tulsa City-County Library Central Library opened.
 1966
 Area of city expands.
 Tulsa Expo Center built; Golden Driller statue permanently installed.
 James M. Hewgley, Jr. becomes mayor.
 1967
 Prayer Tower and Fourth National Bank of Tulsa built.
 Union Depot abandoned after passenger train service ceases.
 1970
 Tulsa Junior College established.
 Robert J. LaFortune becomes mayor.
 Population: 331,638.
 1971 – Tulsa Port of Catoosa opened to shipping via the McClellan-Kerr Arkansas River Navigation System.
 1972
 Roman Catholic Diocese of Tulsa established.
 Area of city: 175.71 square miles.
 1973 – First National BanCorporation Tower built.
 1974 – 
Tulsa Area United Way active.
 F3 tornadoes in the Tulsa metropolitan area kill two people and, combined with flooding, produce the costliest natural disaster in city's history up to that time—a disaster worth $30,000,000 
 1975
 National Bank of Tulsa renamed Bank of Oklahoma (BOK)
 Westhope added to NRHP.
 Tulsa Municipal Building added to NRHP.
 Williams Brothers Tower (now named BOK Tower) built.
 1976
 Memorial Day flood causes major damage along Mingo, Joe and Haikey creeks.
 Woodland Hills Mall in business.
 Tulsa Central High School moves from Downtown facility to new Osage County facility. Former school leased to Public Service Company of Oklahoma as new headquarters following remodeling (repurposing).
 1977 – 
Tulsa Performing Arts Center opens.

 1978
 Tulsa Signature Symphony founded.
 Jim Inhofe becomes mayor.
 Boston Avenue Methodist Church added to NRHP.
 Philbrook Museum of Art added to NRHP.
William G. Skelly House added to NRHP.
 1979
 Convention Hall (Brady Theater) added to NRHP.
 McFarlin Building added to NRHP.
 Philtower added to NRHP.
 Pierce Block added to NRHP.
 Final occurrence of International Petroleum Exposition.
 Mike Synar becomes U.S. representative for Oklahoma's 2nd congressional district.
 1980
 Tulsa Oklahomans for Human Rights group formed.
 Brady Heights Historic District added to NRHP.
 Mayo Hotel added to NRHP.
 Population: 360,919.
 1981
 City of Faith Medical and Research Center opens.
 Tulsa Community Food Bank and Heller Theatre founded.
 1982
 Gillette Historic District added to NRHP.
 Holy Family Cathedral, Rectory and School added to NRHP.
  Tulsa Pride begins.
 1983 – Swan Lake Neighborhood Association and Gilbert and Sullivan Society of Tulsa founded.
 1984
 Mid-Continent Tower built.
 Oklahoma Natural Gas Company Building added to NRHP.
 Public Service of Oklahoma Building added to NRHP.
 1986 – Philcade Building added to NRHP.
 1987
 Chili Bowl midget car race begins.
 Jim Inhofe becomes U.S. representative for Oklahoma's 1st congressional district.
 1988 – Tulsa Preservation Commission and Oklahoma Jazz Hall of Fame established.
 1989
 Osage Expressway opens.
 Mayor–council form of government adopted.
 1990
 Southwest Tulsa Chamber of Commerce formed.
 Population: 367,302.
 1991 – Urban Tulsa Weekly newspaper begins publication.
 1992
 Tulsa receives 1992 Outstanding Public Service Award from Federal Emergency Management Agency (FEMA) for its flood management program.
 Tulsa Tribune goes out of business.
 Susan Savage becomes first woman to serve as mayor of Tulsa.
 1994 - Tulsa Club abandons its namesake building, which remains largely unoccupied for nearly 20 years
 1996 – Camille's Sidewalk Cafe in business.
 1997 – Conestoga science fiction convention begins.
 1998
 Tulsa Community Foundation established.
 Tulsa Air and Space Museum established.
 Swan Lake Historic District added to NRHP.
 1999
 City website online (approximate date).
 Eleventh Street Arkansas River Bridge added to NRHP.
 Hindu Temple of Greater Tulsa founded.
 2000 – Population: 393,049; metro population: 859,532.

21st century

 2001 – White City Historic District added to NRHP
 2002
 Diversafest begins;
Yorktown Historic District added to NRHP.
 2003 – Cain's Ballroom added to NRHP
 2004 – 11th Street Bridge renamed as Cyrus Avery Route 66 Memorial Bridge.
 2005
 Tulsa Symphony Orchestra formed.
 Oklahoma Center for Community and Justice headquartered in Tulsa.
 2006 – Bell's Amusement Park goes out of business.
 2007
Union Depot building converted to house Oklahoma Jazz Hall of Fame.
Will Rogers High School added to NRHP.
Buena Vista Park Historic District added to NRHP.
Ranch Acres Historic District added to NRHP.
 2008
 University of Tulsa selected to manage the Gilcrease Museum.
 Tokyo, OK (formerly Tokyo in Tulsa) anime convention begins.
 BOK Center stadium opens.
 Mt. Zion Baptist Church added to NRHP.
 Opening of Cyrus Avery Route 66 Memorial Plaza
 2009
 Old Temple Israel accidentally burns down
Tulsa Botanic Garden opens to public.
 Dewey F. Bartlett, Jr. becomes mayor.
 Atlas Life Building added to NRHP.
 2010
 This Land Press begins publication.
 Population: 391,906; metro 937,478.
 Area of city: 196.75 square miles.
 Oil Capital Historic District created on December 10, 2010.
Brady Historic District added to NRHP.
 2012 – Oklahoma Defenders football team active.

 2013
Tulsa Convention Center renamed as Cox Business Center.
 Center of the Universe Festival (music fest) held.
 Woody Guthrie Center opens as museum and archive for the artist.
 Jim Bridenstine becomes U.S. representative for Oklahoma's 1st congressional district.
 Construction begins on Phase 1 of Cousins Park.
2014
Woodward Park and Gardens Historic District established
Helmerich Center for American Research at Gilcrease Museum completed.
2015
 James Pepper Henry becomes director of Gilcrease Museum on March 1.
 Frontier news begins publication. 
 Oklahoma Defenders football team ceased operating.
2016
 Vision 2025 Tax plan approved by voters to provide funding for planned major projects.
 Former Public Service of Oklahoma (PSO) headquarters renamed as Art Deco Lofts and Apartments; new residents begin move-in in July.
2017
 James Pepper Henry resigns as director of Gilcrease Museum, effective April 14, to become Director of the American Indian Cultural Center & Museum in Oklahoma City.
 EF-2 Tornado strikes southeast Tulsa after midnight August 5–6, causing major property damage, especially to Promenade Mall and 18-story Remington Tower office building near 41st Street and Skelly Drive. The storm caused no deaths, but sent 32 people to hospitals.
2018 "Gathering Place" holds grand opening to public on September 8.
2019  
 Tulsa Club Hotel (formerly known as the Tulsa Club Building) opens for business on April 18.
 High water along the Arkansas River and its tributaries cause serious flooding in Tulsa Metropolitan area; forces shutdowns of Gathering Place and the Tulsa Port of Catoosa.
2020
 U.S. Census population 413,066.
 Wendell Franklin appointed as Chief of Police on February 1.
2021  
Former congressman Brad Carson becomes president of University of Tulsa on July 1.
2022  
 Discovery Lab at Gathering Place holds grand opening on January 24.
 Warren Clinic shooting

See also
 List of mayors of Tulsa, Oklahoma
 National Register of Historic Places listings in Tulsa County, Oklahoma
 Timelines of other cities in Oklahoma: Norman, Oklahoma City

References

Bibliography

Published in 20th century
 
 
 
 
 James M. Hall, The Beginning of Tulsa (Tulsa, Okla: N.p., 1933).
 
 
 Angie Debo, Tulsa: From Creek Town to Oil Capital , 1943. Norman: University of Oklahoma Press.
 Nina Dunn, “Tulsa’s Magic Roots: An Early History of Tulsa,” (Okla. Book Pub. Co. 1979)
 The Tulsa Historic Preservation Plan (Tulsa, Okla.: Tulsa Preservation Commission, 1992).
 Danney Goble, Tulsa! Biography of the American City (Tulsa, Okla.: Council Oak Books, 1997).

Published in 21st century

External links

 
 Items related to Tulsa, Oklahoma, various dates (via Digital Public Library of America)
 Materials related to Tulsa, various dates (via US Library of Congress, Prints & Photos Division)
  (Sortable by decade)

Tulsa
Tulsa